The Latvian Farmers' Union (LZS) is an agrarian political party in Latvia.

Initially formed in 1917 during the period of Latvian War of Independence, it was banned in 1934. It was re-established in 1990. It is positioned in the centre on the political spectrum and it has expressed conservative and nationalistic rhetoric. Since 2002, the party has been a part of the Union of Greens and Farmers (ZZS), together with the Latvian Green Party. It was formerly a member of the Alliance of Liberals and Democrats for Europe.

History

Founded in 1917, the party was the most influential conservative party in Latvia in the period from Independence in 1918 until the self-coup led by Kārlis Ulmanis in 1934, and the second most popular party overall after the Latvian Social Democratic Workers' Party. Ulmanis, who was a member of the party, banned all political parties after his coup including the LZS. As Latvia was subsequently occupied during the course of the Second World War, the party was dormant until it reformed in 1990 when Latvia regained its independence. Immediately after the restoration of independence, there existed several groups competing at elections to claim the legacy of the pre-war LZS.  

Since 2002 it has been part of the Union of Greens and Farmers (ZZS) coalition, which it formed along with the Latvian Green Party. The coalition also included the For Latvia and Ventspils and the Liepāja Party, who had cooperation agreements with the party allowing their members to be elected to the Saeima on the list of the Union of Greens and Farmers. 

From 2014 to 2019 the party had one member of the European Parliament, Iveta Grigule, who ultimately sat with the Alliance of Liberals and Democrats group, having previously sat with the Europe of Freedom and Direct Democracy group and as a Non-Attached Member.

The Green Party and the Liepāja Party left ZZS in June 2022, but were replaced by the Latvian Social Democratic Workers' Party.

Electoral results

Legislative elections

Symbols and logos

References

External links
 

Agrarian parties
Centrist parties in Latvia
Conservative parties in Latvia
Formerly banned political parties
Political parties of the Russian Revolution
Pro-independence parties in the Soviet Union